Nicholas Fortescue may refer to:

Nicholas Fortescue the Elder (1575?–1633), chamberlain of the exchequer
Nicholas Fortescue the Younger (1605?–1644), knight of St John